State Route 87 (SR 87) is an east–west highway in northeastern Ohio, a U.S. state.  Its western terminus is at Public Square in downtown Cleveland. It is one of 9 other routes to enter downtown Cleveland at Public Square.  87 ends at an intersection with SR 5 and SR 7 in Kinsman Township.

Route description
SR 87 begins at Public Square in Cleveland, at an intersection with US 6 / US 42 / SR 3. The route heads eastward and becomes Buckeye Road, and then Shaker Boulevard, which is a divided boulevard with RTA commuter rail tracks (the "Rapid") between the east- and westbound lanes as it travels through Shaker Heights.

A short distance later, at the I-271 interchange, US 422 leaves the concurrency southward, and SR 87 continues east on Chagrin Boulevard through Woodmere Village and Pepper Pike, and then on Pinetree Road and South Woodland Road, intersects SR 91 (SOM Center Road) and enters Moreland Hills.

SR 87 enters Geauga County and becomes Kinsman Road for most of its remaining length, and intersects SR 306 (Chillicothe Road), passes by Punderson State Park, and intersects SR 44 (Ravenna Road) at Newbury.

The route then enters Burton, where it temporarily becomes Center Street and intersects SR 168 (Cheshire Street); then through Ohio's second largest Amish community in Middlefield as High Street, the route intersects SR 608 (State Street).

Just east of Middlefield, the route resumes its Kinsman Road name, and intersects with SR 528 (Madison Road), before entering Trumbull County.

In Trumbull County, SR 87 intersects SR 534 at Mesopotamia, and then SR 45 at North Bloomfield.  Next, it crosses SR 46, followed by its interchange with SR 11.  Finally, it intersects SR 193 and reaches its terminus at the SR 5 / SR 7 concurrency in Kinsman Township.

History

Original state route; originally routed from Woodmere to Pennsylvania state line on its current alignment to Burton, State Route 168’s current alignment from Burton to Parkman, and along State Route 88’s current alignment from Parkman to the state line.
1926 – Western terminus moved to Cleveland along previously unnumbered roads.
1926 – Swapped alignments with State Route 168 east of Burton; old alignment from Parkman to state line was designated State Route 88.
1938 – Eastern terminus moved to its current location via previously unnumbered roads.

Major intersections

References

087
Transportation in Cuyahoga County, Ohio
Transportation in Geauga County, Ohio
Transportation in Trumbull County, Ohio